Wycliffe Global Alliance is an alliance of organizations that have objective of translating the Bible into every language. The organisation is named after John Wycliffe, who was responsible for the first complete English translation of the whole Bible into Middle English.

Wycliffe is most often associated with the Protestant section of Christianity. There are currently over 100 Wycliffe member organisations from over 60 countries. Wycliffe Global Alliance is also a member of the Forum of Bible Agencies International.

, translations of either portions of the Bible, the New Testament, or the whole Bible exist in over 3,350 of the 7,350 languages used on Earth, including 245 sign languages.

History 
Wycliffe Bible Translators USA was founded in 1942 by William Cameron Townsend. When other Wycliffe organisations were founded around the world, they initially operated as its divisions in those countries. A new organisation, Wycliffe Bible Translators International, was started in May 1980 to provide this international leadership.

In 1991 Wycliffe International was restructured so that the Wycliffe organisations in each country became fully independent, causing Wycliffe International to become an association of organisations. In February 2011, Wycliffe International took on a new "doing business as" name, Wycliffe Global Alliance.

Philosophy and methods
Wycliffe bases its philosophy on Townsend's Protestantism which regards the intercultural and multilinguistic spread of Christianity as a divine command. The organization adheres to the principle of sola scriptura and regards Biblical texts as the authoritative and infallible word of God.

Wycliffe states its focus is participating with and encouraging Christian churches to minister to minority languages, so that every language community can have access to the Bible.

Wycliffe Global Alliance emphasizes its international nature. It describes itself as "multicultural, multinational, creative and facilitative." Wycliffe Global Alliance has its headquarters in Singapore. The Global Leadership Team is a virtual team and is spread across Africa, the Americas, Asia, Australia, and Europe.

Associated organisations
 Finland: 
 Germany: Allianz-Mission, 
 Ghana: GILLBT
 Indonesia: Kartidaya, Gereja Protestan Indonesia Donggala, Protestant Church of Maluku
 Netherlands: 
 Norway: 
 United Kingdom: Wycliffe Bible Translators (UK & Ireland), MissionAssist
 United States: Wycliffe Bible Translators USA, Seed Company, Faith Comes By Hearing

See also
 Bible translations by language
 Joshua Project

References

External links 

Bible societies
Christian missions
Christian organizations established in 1980
Bible translators
International Christian organizations